Genista germanica, the German greenweed, is a plant species in the genus Genista belonging to the family Fabaceae.

Distribution and habitat
This species grows in Central Europe, Western Europe and Southern Europe (Belarus, Estonia, Lithuania, Russian Federation, Ukraine, Austria, Belgium, Czechoslovakia; Germany, Hungary, Netherlands, Poland, Switzerland, Denmark, Sweden, Bulgaria, Former Yugoslavia, Italy, Romania, France).

Description
These small perennial shrubs may have erect or prostrate stems, woody at the base, with robust simple or branched thorns. Only the young branches are green, slightly hairy. The deciduous leaves are oval-lanceolate, bright green and pubescent. The flowers, hermaphrodite, are gathered in short racemes, the calyx is pubescent with lanceolate teeth, the corolla is yellow. They bloom in May and June. The fruits are ovoid legumes of about 10 mm, with 2 to 4 ovoid, brownish seeds.

Gallery

Bibliography
Gibbs, P. E. 1966. A revision of the genus Genista L. Notes Roy. Bot. Gard. Edinburgh 27:70.
Liberty Hyde Bailey Hortorium Hortus third. 1976 (Hortus 3) 
Pignatti, S. Flora d'Italia. 1982 
Turland, N. J. & C. E. Jarvis 1997. Typification of Linnaean specific and varietal names in the Leguminosae (Fabaceae) (Taxon) 46:470.
Tutin, T. G. et al., eds. Flora europaea. 1964-1980
Yakovlev, G. P. et al. Legumes of Northern Eurasia. 1996

References

External links
 Luirig Altervista
 

germanica
Flora of Europe
Plants described in 1753
Taxa named by Carl Linnaeus